Jamie Murray and Bruno Soares were the defending champions and successfully defended their title, defeating Bob and Mike Bryan in the final, 7–6(7–4), 7–5.

Seeds

Draw

Draw

Qualifying

Seeds

Qualifiers
  Radu Albot /  Nikoloz Basilashvili

Lucky losers
  Max Mirnyi /  Philipp Oswald

Qualifying draw

References
 Main draw
 Qualifying draw

2018 Abierto Mexicano Telcel